The history of feminism comprises the narratives (chronological or thematic) of the movements and ideologies which have aimed at equal rights for women. While feminists around the world have differed in causes, goals, and intentions depending on time, culture, and country, most Western feminist historians assert that all movements that work to obtain women's rights should be considered feminist movements, even when they did not (or do not) apply the term to themselves. Some other historians limit the term "feminist" to the modern feminist movement and its progeny, and use the label "protofeminist" to describe earlier movements.

Modern Western feminist history is conventionally split into three time periods, or "waves", each with slightly different aims based on prior progress:

 First-wave feminism of the 19th and early 20th centuries focused on overturning legal inequalities, particularly addressing issues of women's suffrage
 Second-wave feminism (1960s–1980s) broadened debate to include cultural inequalities, gender norms, and the role of women in society
 Third-wave feminism (1990s–2000s) refers to diverse strains of feminist activity, seen by third-wavers themselves both as a continuation of the second wave and as a response to its perceived failures

Although the "waves" construct has been commonly used to describe the history of feminism, the concept has also been criticized by non-White feminists for ignoring and erasing the history between the "waves", by choosing to focus solely on a few famous figures, on the perspective of a white bourgeois woman and on popular events, and for being "racist" and "colonialist."

Early feminism 

People and activists who discuss or advance women's equality prior to the existence of the feminist movement are sometimes labeled as protofeminist. Some scholars criticize this term because they believe it diminishes the importance of earlier contributions or that feminism does not have a single begin or linear history as implied by terms such as protofeminist or postfeminist.

Around 24 centuries ago, Plato, according to Elaine Hoffman Baruch, "[argued] for the total political and sexual equality of women, advocating that they be members of his highest class, ... those who rule and fight".

Andal, a female Tamil saint, lived around the 7th or 8th century. She is well known for writing Tiruppavai. Andal has inspired women's groups such as Goda Mandali. Her divine marriage to Vishnu is viewed by some as a feminist act, as it allowed her to avoid the regular duties of being a wife and gain autonomy.

Renaissance Feminism 
Italian-French writer Christine de Pizan (1364 – c. 1430), the author of The Book of the City of Ladies and Epître au Dieu d'Amour (Epistle to the God of Love) is cited by Simone de Beauvoir as the first woman to denounce misogyny and write about the relation of the sexes. Christine de Pizan also wrote one of the early fictional accounts of gender transition in Le Livre de la mutation de fortune. Other early feminist writers include the 16th-century writers Heinrich Cornelius Agrippa, Modesta di Pozzo di Forzi, and Jane Anger, and the 17th-century writers Hannah Woolley in England, Juana Inés de la Cruz in Mexico, Marie Le Jars de Gournay, Anne Bradstreet, Anna Maria van Schurman and François Poullain de la Barre. The emergence of women as true intellectuals effected change also in Italian humanism. Cassandra Fedele was the first women to join a humanist group and achieved much despite greater constraints on women.

Renaissance defenses of women are present in a variety of literary genre and across Europe with a central claim of equality. Feminists appealed to principles that progressively lead to discourse of economic property injustice themes. Feminizing society was a way for women at this time to use literature to create interdependent and non-hierarchical systems that provided opportunities for both women and men.

Men have also played an important role in the history of defending that women are capable and able to compete equally with men, including Antonio Cornazzano, Vespasiano de Bisticci, and Giovanni Sabadino degli Arienti. Castiglione continues this trend of defending woman's moral character and that traditions are at fault for the appearance of women's inferiority. However, the critique is that there is no advocacy for social change, leaving her out of the political sphere, and abandoning her to traditional domestic roles. Although, many of them would encourage that if women were to be included in the political sphere it would be a natural consequence of their education. In addition, some of these men state that men are at fault for the lack of knowledge of intellectual women by leaving them out of historical records.

One of the most important 17th-century feminist writers in the English language was Margaret Cavendish, Duchess of Newcastle-upon-Tyne. Her knowledge was recognized by some, such as proto-feminist Bathsua Makin, who wrote that "The present Dutchess of New-Castle, by her own Genius, rather than any timely Instruction, over-tops many grave Grown-Men," and considered her a prime example of what women could become through education.

17th century 
Margaret Fell's most famous work is "Women's Speaking Justified", a scripture-based argument for women's ministry, and one of the major texts on women's religious leadership in the 17th century. In this short pamphlet, Fell based her argument for equality of the sexes on one of the basic premises of Quakerism, namely spiritual equality. Her belief was that God created all human beings, therefore both men and women were capable of not only possessing the Inner Light but also the ability to be a prophet. Fell has been described as a "feminist pioneer".

18th century: the Age of Enlightenment 
The Age of Enlightenment was characterized by secular intellectual reasoning and a flowering of philosophical writing. Many Enlightenment philosophers defended the rights of women, including Jeremy Bentham (1781), Marquis de Condorcet (1790), and Mary Wollstonecraft (1792). Other important writers of the time that expressed feminist views included Abigail Adams, Catharine Macaulay, and Hedvig Charlotta Nordenflycht.

Jeremy Bentham 
The English utilitarian and classical liberal philosopher Jeremy Bentham said that it was the placing of women in a legally inferior position that made him choose the career of a reformist at the age of eleven, though American critic John Neal claimed to have convinced him to take up women's rights issues during their association between 1825 and 1827. Bentham spoke for complete equality between sexes including the rights to vote and to participate in government. He opposed the asymmetrical sexual moral standards between men and women.

In his Introduction to the Principles of Morals and Legislation (1781), Bentham strongly condemned many countries' common practice to deny women's rights due to allegedly inferior minds. Bentham gave many examples of able female regents.

Marquis de Condorcet 
Nicolas de Condorcet was a mathematician, classical liberal politician, leading French Revolutionary, republican, and Voltairean anti-clericalist. He was also a fierce defender of human rights, including the equality of women and the abolition of slavery, unusual for the 1780s. He advocated for women's suffrage in the new government in 1790 with De l'admission des femmes au droit de cité (For the Admission to the Rights of Citizenship For Women) and an article for Journal de la Société de 1789.

Olympe de Gouges and a Declaration 
Following de Condorcet's repeated, yet failed, appeals to the National Assembly in 1789 and 1790, Olympe de Gouges (in association with the Society of the Friends of Truth) authored and published the Declaration of the Rights of Woman and of the Female Citizen in 1791. This was another plea for the French Revolutionary government to recognize the natural and political rights of women. De Gouges wrote the Declaration in the prose of the Declaration of the Rights of Man and of the Citizen, almost mimicking the failure of men to include more than a half of the French population in egalité. Even though the Declaration did not immediately accomplish its goals, it did set a precedent for a manner in which feminists could satirize their governments for their failures in equality, seen in documents such as A Vindication of the Rights of Woman and A Declaration of Sentiments.

Wollstonecraft and A Vindication 

Perhaps the most cited feminist writer of the time was Mary Wollstonecraft, She identified the education and upbringing of women as creating their limited expectations based on a self-image dictated by the typically male perspective. Despite her perceived inconsistencies (Miriam Brody referred to the "Two Wollstonecrafts") reflective of problems that had no easy answers, this book remains a foundation stone of feminist thought.

Wollstonecraft believed that both genders contributed to inequality. She took women's considerable power over men for granted, and determined that both would require education to ensure the necessary changes in social attitudes. Given her humble origins and scant education, her personal achievements speak to her own determination. Wollstonecraft attracted the mockery of Samuel Johnson, who described her and her ilk as "Amazons of the pen". Based on his relationship with Hester Thrale, he complained of women's encroachment onto a male territory of writing, and not their intelligence or education. For many commentators, Wollstonecraft represents the first codification of equality feminism, or a refusal of the feminine role in society.

19th century

The feminine ideal 
19th-century feminists reacted to cultural inequities including the pernicious, widespread acceptance of the Victorian image of women's "proper" role and "sphere". The Victorian ideal created a dichotomy of "separate spheres" for men and women that was very clearly defined in theory, though not always in reality. In this ideology, men were to occupy the public sphere (the space of wage labor and politics) and women the private sphere (the space of home and children.) This "feminine ideal", also called "The Cult of Domesticity", was typified in Victorian conduct books such as Mrs Beeton's Book of Household Management and Sarah Stickney Ellis's books. The Angel in the House (1854) and El ángel del hogar, bestsellers by Coventry Patmore and Maria del Pilar Sinués de Marco, came to symbolize the Victorian feminine ideal. Queen Victoria herself disparaged the concept of feminism, which she described in private letters as the "mad, wicked folly of 'Woman's Rights'".

Feminism in fiction 
As Jane Austen addressed women's restricted lives in the early part of the century, Charlotte Brontë, Anne Brontë, Elizabeth Gaskell, and George Eliot depicted women's misery and frustration. In her autobiographical novel Ruth Hall (1854), American journalist Fanny Fern describes her own struggle to support her children as a newspaper columnist after her husband's untimely death. Louisa May Alcott penned a strongly feminist novel, A Long Fatal Love Chase (1866), about a young woman's attempts to flee her bigamist husband and become independent.

Male authors also recognized injustices against women. The novels of George Meredith, George Gissing, and Thomas Hardy, and the plays of Henrik Ibsen outlined the contemporary plight of women. Meredith's Diana of the Crossways (1885) is an account of Caroline Norton's life. One critic later called Ibsen's plays "feministic propaganda".

John Neal 

John Neal is remembered as America's first women's rights lecturer. Starting in 1823 and continuing at least as late as 1869, he used magazine articles, short stories, novels, public speaking, political organizing, and personal relationships to advance feminist issues in the United States and Great Britain, reaching the height of his influence in this field circa 1843. He declared intellectual equality between men and women, fought coverture, and demanded suffrage, equal pay, and better education and working conditions for women. Neal's early feminist essays in the 1820s fill an intellectual gap between Mary Wollstonecraft, Catharine Macaulay, and Judith Sargent Murray and Seneca Falls Convention-era successors like Sarah Moore Grimké, Elizabeth Cady Stanton, and Margaret Fuller. As a male writer insulated from many common forms of attack against female feminist thinkers, Neal's advocacy was crucial in bringing the field back into the mainstream in England and the US.

In his essays for Blackwood's Magazine (1824-1825), Neal called for women's suffrage and "maintain[ed] that women are not inferior to men, but only unlike men, in their intellectual properties" and "would have women treated like men, of common sense." In The Yankee magazine (1828–1829), he demanded economic opportunities for women, saying "We hope to see the day... when our women of all ages... will be able to maintain herself, without being obliged to marry for bread." At his most well-attended lecture titled "Rights of Women," Neal spoke before a crowd of around 3,000 people in 1843 at New York City's largest auditorium at the time, the Broadway Tabernacle. Neal became even more prominently involved with the women's suffrage movement in his old age following the Civil War, both in Maine and nationally in the US by supporting Elizabeth Cady Stanton's and Susan B. Anthony's National Woman Suffrage Association and writing for its journal, The Revolution. Stanton and Anthony recognized his work after his death in their History of Woman Suffrage.

Marion Reid and Caroline Norton 
At the outset of the 19th century, the dissenting feminist voices had little to no social influence. There was little sign of change in the political or social order, nor any evidence of a recognizable women's movement. Collective concerns began to coalesce by the end of the century, paralleling the emergence of a stiffer social model and code of conduct that Marion Reid described as confining and repressive for women. While the increased emphasis on feminine virtue partly stirred the call for a woman's movement, the tensions that this role caused for women plagued many early-19th-century feminists with doubt and worry, and fueled opposing views.

In Scotland, Reid published her influential A Plea for Woman in 1843, which proposed a transatlantic Western agenda for women's rights, including voting rights for women.

Caroline Norton advocated for changes in British law. She discovered a lack of legal rights for women upon entering an abusive marriage. The publicity generated from her appeal to Queen Victoria and related activism helped change English laws to recognize and accommodate married women and child custody issues.

Florence Nightingale and Frances Power Cobbe 

While many women including Norton were wary of organized movements, their actions and words often motivated and inspired such movements. Among these was Florence Nightingale, whose conviction that women had all the potential of men but none of the opportunities impelled her storied nursing career. At the time, her feminine virtues were emphasized over her ingenuity, an example of the bias against acknowledging female accomplishment in the mid-1800s.

Due to varying ideologies, feminists were not always supportive of each other's efforts. Harriet Martineau and others dismissed Wollstonecraft's contributions as dangerous, and deplored Norton's candidness, but seized on the abolitionist campaign that Martineau had witnessed in the United States as one that should logically be applied to women. Her Society in America was pivotal: it caught the imagination of women who urged her to take up their cause.

Anna Wheeler was influenced by Saint Simonian socialists while working in France. She advocated for suffrage and attracted the attention of Benjamin Disraeli, the Conservative leader, as a dangerous radical on a par with Jeremy Bentham. She would later inspire early socialist and feminist advocate William Thompson, who wrote the first work published in English to advocate full equality of rights for women, the 1825 "Appeal of One Half of the Human Race".

Feminists of previous centuries charged women's exclusion from education as the central cause for their domestic relegation and denial of social advancement, and women's 19th-century education was no better. Frances Power Cobbe, among others, called for education reform, an issue that gained attention alongside marital and property rights, and domestic violence.

Female journalists like Martineau and Cobbe in Britain, and Margaret Fuller in America, were achieving journalistic employment, which placed them in a position to influence other women. Cobbe would refer to "Woman's Rights" not just in the abstract, but as an identifiable cause.

Ladies of Langham Place 

Barbara Leigh Smith and her friends met regularly during the 1850s in London's Langham Place to discuss the united women's voice necessary for achieving reform. These "Ladies of Langham Place" included Bessie Rayner Parkes and Anna Jameson. They focused on education, employment, and marital law. One of their causes became the Married Women's Property Committee of 1855. They collected thousands of signatures for legislative reform petitions, some of which were successful. Smith had also attended the 1848 Seneca Falls Convention in America.

Smith and Parkes, together and apart, wrote many articles on education and employment opportunities. In the same year as Norton, Smith summarized the legal framework for injustice in her 1854 A Brief Summary of the Laws of England concerning Women. She was able to reach large numbers of women via her role in the English Women's Journal. The response to this journal led to their creation of the Society for Promoting the Employment of Women (SPEW). Smith's Married Women's Property committee collected 26,000 signatures to change the law for all women, including those unmarried.

Harriet Taylor published her Enfranchisement in 1851, and wrote about the inequities of family law. In 1853, she married John Stuart Mill, and provided him with much of the subject material for The Subjection of Women.

Emily Davies also encountered the Langham group, and with Elizabeth Garrett created SPEW branches outside London.

Educational reform 

The interrelated barriers to education and employment formed the backbone of 19th-century feminist reform efforts, for instance, as described by Harriet Martineau in her 1859 Edinburgh Journal article, "Female Industry". These barriers did not change in conjunction with the economy. Martineau, however, remained a moderate, for practical reasons, and unlike Cobbe, did not support the emerging call for the vote.

The education reform efforts of women like Davies and the Langham group slowly made inroads. Queen's College (1848) and Bedford College (1849) in London began to offer some education to women from 1848. By 1862, Davies established a committee to persuade the universities to allow women to sit for the recently established Local Examinations, and achieved partial success in 1865. She published The Higher Education of Women a year later. Davies and Leigh Smith founded the first higher educational institution for women and enrolled five students. The school later became Girton College, Cambridge in 1869, Newnham College, Cambridge in 1871, and Lady Margaret Hall at Oxford in 1879. Bedford began to award degrees the previous year. Despite these measurable advances, few could take advantage of them and life for female students was still difficult.

In the 1883 Ilbert Bill controversy, a British India bill that proposed Indian judicial jurisdiction to try British criminals, Bengali women in support of the bill responded by claiming that they were more educated than the English women opposed to the bill, and noted that more Indian women had degrees than British women at the time.

As part of the continuing dialogue between British and American feminists, Elizabeth Blackwell, one of the first American women to graduate in medicine (1849), lectured in Britain with Langham support. She eventually took her degree in France. Garrett's very successful 1870 campaign to run for London School Board office is another example of a how a small band of very determined women were beginning to reach positions of influence at the local government level.

Women's campaigns 
Campaigns gave women opportunities to test their new political skills and to conjoin disparate social reform groups. Their successes include the campaign for the Married Women's Property Act (passed in 1882) and the campaign to repeal the Contagious Diseases Acts of 1864, 1866, and 1869, which united women's groups and utilitarian liberals like John Stuart Mill.

Generally, women were outraged by the inherent inequity and misogyny of the legislation. For the first time, women in large numbers took up the rights of prostitutes. Prominent critics included Blackwell, Nightingale, Martineau, and Elizabeth Wolstenholme. Elizabeth Garrett, unlike her sister, Millicent, did not support the campaign, though she later admitted that the campaign had done well.

Josephine Butler, already experienced in prostitution issues, a charismatic leader, and a seasoned campaigner, emerged as the natural leader of what became the Ladies National Association for the Repeal of the Contagious Diseases Acts in 1869. Her work demonstrated the potential power of an organized lobby group. The association successfully argued that the Acts not only demeaned prostitutes, but all women and men by promoting a blatant sexual double standard. Butler's activities resulted in the radicalization of many moderate women. The Acts were repealed in 1886.

On a smaller scale, Annie Besant campaigned for the rights of matchgirls (female factory workers) and against the appalling conditions under which they worked in London. Her work of publicizing the difficult conditions of the workers through interviews in bi-weekly periodicals like The Link became a method for raising public concern over social issues.

19th to 21st centuries 

Feminists did not recognize separate waves of feminism until the second wave was so named by journalist Martha Weinman Lear in a 1968 New York Times Magazine article "The Second Feminist Wave", according to Alice Echols. Jennifer Baumgardner reports criticism by professor Roxanne Dunbar-Ortiz of the division into waves and the difficulty of categorizing some feminists into specific waves, argues that the main critics of a wave are likely to be members of the prior wave who remain vital, and that waves are coming faster. The "waves debate" has influenced how historians and other scholars have established the chronologies of women's political activism.

First wave 

The 19th- and early 20th-century feminist activity in the English-speaking world that sought to win women's suffrage, female education rights, better working conditions, and abolition of gender double standards is known as first-wave feminism. The term "first-wave" was coined retrospectively when the term second-wave feminism was used to describe a newer feminist movement that fought social and cultural inequalities beyond basic political inequalities.
In the United States, feminist movement leaders campaigned for the national abolition of slavery and Temperance before championing women's rights. American first-wave feminism involved a wide range of women, some belonging to conservative Christian groups (such as Frances Willard and the Woman's Christian Temperance Union), others resembling the diversity and radicalism of much of second-wave feminism (such as Stanton, Anthony, Matilda Joslyn Gage, and the National Woman Suffrage Association, of which Stanton was president). First-wave feminism in the United States is considered to have ended with the passage of the Nineteenth Amendment to the United States Constitution (1920), which granted women the right to vote in the United States.

Activism for the equality of women was not limited to the United States. In mid-nineteenth century Persia, Táhirih, an early member of the Bábí Faith, was active as a poet and religious reformer. At a time when it was considered taboo for women to speak openly with men in Persia, and for non-clerics to speak about religion, she challenged the intellectuals of the age in public discourse on social and theological matters. In 1848 she appeared before an assemblage of men without a veil and gave a speech on the rights of women, signaling a radical break with the prevailing moral order and the start of a new religious and social dispensation. After this episode she was put under house arrest by the Persian Government until her execution by strangling at the age of 35 in August 1852. At her execution she is reported as proclaiming "You can kill me as soon as you like, but you cannot stop the emancipation of women." The story of her life rapidly spread to European circles and she would inspire later generations of Iranian feminists. Members of the Bahá'í Faith recognize her as the first women's suffrage martyr and an example of fearlessness and courage in the advancement of the equality of women and men.

Louise Dittmar campaigned for women's rights, in Germany, in the 1840s. Although slightly later in time, Fusae Ichikawa was in the first wave of women's activists in her own country of Japan, campaigning for women's suffrage. Mary Lee was active in the suffrage movement in South Australia, the first Australian colony to grant women the vote in 1894. In New Zealand, Kate Sheppard and Mary Ann Müller worked to achieve the vote for women by 1893.

In the United States, the antislavery campaign of the 1830s served as both a cause ideologically compatible with feminism and a blueprint for later feminist political organizing. Attempts to exclude women only strengthened their convictions. Sarah and Angelina Grimké moved rapidly from the emancipation of slaves to the emancipation of women. The most influential feminist writer of the time was the colourful journalist Margaret Fuller, whose Woman in the Nineteenth Century was published in 1845. Her dispatches from Europe for the New York Tribune helped create to synchronize the women's rights movement.

Elizabeth Cady Stanton and Lucretia Mott met in 1840 while en route to London where they were shunned as women by the male leadership of the first World's Anti-Slavery Convention. In 1848, Mott and Stanton held a woman's rights convention in Seneca Falls, New York, where a declaration of independence for women was drafted. Lucy Stone helped to organize the first National Women's Rights Convention in 1850, a much larger event at which Sojourner Truth, Abby Kelley Foster, and others spoke sparked Susan B. Anthony to take up the cause of women's rights. In December 1851, Sojourner Truth contributed to the feminist movement when she spoke at the Women's Convention in Akron, Ohio. She delivered her powerful "Ain't I a Woman" speech in an effort to promote women's rights by demonstrating their ability to accomplish tasks that have been traditionally associated with men. Barbara Leigh Smith met with Mott in 1858, strengthening the link between the transatlantic feminist movements.

Stanton and Matilda Joslyn Gage saw the Church as a major obstacle to women's rights, and welcomed the emerging literature on matriarchy. Both Gage and Stanton produced works on this topic, and collaborated on The Woman's Bible. Stanton wrote "The Matriarchate or Mother-Age" and Gage wrote Woman, Church and State, neatly inverting Johann Jakob Bachofen's thesis and adding a unique epistemological perspective, the critique of objectivity and the perception of the subjective.

Stanton once observed regarding assumptions of female inferiority, "The worst feature of these assumptions is that women themselves believe them". However this attempt to replace androcentric (male-centered) theological tradition with a gynocentric (female-centered) view made little headway in a women's movement dominated by religious elements; thus she and Gage were largely ignored by subsequent generations.

By 1913, Feminism (originally capitalized) was a household term in the United States. Major issues in the 1910s and 1920s included suffrage, women's partisan activism, economics and employment, sexualities and families, war and peace, and a Constitutional amendment for equality. Both equality and difference were seen as routes to women's empowerment. Organizations at the time included the National Woman's Party, suffrage advocacy groups such as the National American Woman Suffrage Association and the National League of Women Voters, career associations such as the American Association of University Women, the National Federation of Business and Professional Women's Clubs, and the National Women's Trade Union League, war and peace groups such as the Women's International League for Peace and Freedom and the International Council of Women, alcohol-focused groups like the Woman's Christian Temperance Union and the Women's Organization for National Prohibition Reform, and race- and gender-centered organizations like the National Association of Colored Women. Leaders and theoreticians included Jane Addams, Ida B. Wells-Barnett, Alice Paul, Carrie Chapman Catt, Margaret Sanger, and Charlotte Perkins Gilman.

Suffrage 

The women's right to vote, with its legislative representation, represented a paradigm shift where women would no longer be treated as second-class citizens without a voice. The women's suffrage campaign is the most deeply embedded campaign of the past 250 years.

At first, suffrage was treated as a lower priority. The French Revolution accelerated this, with the assertions of Condorcet and de Gouges, and the women who led the 1789 march on Versailles. In 1793, the Society of Revolutionary Republican Women was founded, and originally included suffrage on its agenda before it was suppressed at the end of the year. As a gesture, this showed that issue was now part of the European political agenda.

German women were involved in the Vormärz, a prelude to the 1848 revolution. In Italy, Clara Maffei, Cristina Trivulzio Belgiojoso, and Ester Martini Currica were politically active in the events leading up to 1848. In Britain, interest in suffrage emerged from the writings of Wheeler and Thompson in the 1820s, and from Reid, Taylor, and Anne Knight in the 1840s. While New Zealand was the first sovereign state where women won the right to vote (1893), they did not win the right to stand in elections until later. The Australian State of South Australia was the first sovereign state in the world to officially grant full suffrage to women (in 1894).

The suffragettes 

The Langham Place ladies set up a suffrage committee at an 1866 meeting at Elizabeth Garrett's home, renamed the London Society for Women's Suffrage in 1867. Soon similar committees had spread across the country, raising petitions, and working closely with John Stuart Mill. When denied outlets by establishment periodicals, feminists started their own, such as Lydia Becker's Women's Suffrage Journal in 1870.

Other publications included Richard Pankhurst's Englishwoman's Review (1866). Tactical disputes were the biggest problem, and the groups' memberships fluctuated. Women considered whether men (like Mill) should be involved. As it went, Mill withdrew as the movement became more aggressive with each disappointment. The political pressure ensured debate, but year after year the movement was defeated in Parliament.

Despite this, the women accrued political experience, which translated into slow progress at the local government level. But after years of frustration, many women became increasingly radicalized. Some refused to pay taxes, and the Pankhurst family emerged as the dominant movement influence, having also founded the Women's Franchise League in 1889, which sought local election suffrage for women.

International suffrage 

The Isle of Man, a UK dependency, was the first free standing jurisdiction to grant women the vote (1881), followed by the right to vote (but not to stand) in New Zealand in 1893, where Kate Sheppard had pioneered reform. Some Australian states had also granted women the vote. This included Victoria for a brief period (1863–5), South Australia (1894), and Western Australia (1899). Australian women received the vote at the Federal level in 1902, Finland in 1906, and Norway initially in 1907 (completed in 1913).

Early 20th century 

In the early part of the 20th century, also known as the Edwardian era, there was a change in the way women dressed from the Victorian rigidity and complacency. Women, especially women who married a wealthy man, would often wear what we consider today, practical.

Books, articles, speeches, pictures, and papers from the period show a diverse range of themes other than political reform and suffrage discussed publicly. In the Netherlands, for instance, the main feminist issues were educational rights, rights to medical care, improved working conditions, peace, and dismantled gender double standards. Feminists identified as such with little fanfare.

Emmeline Pankhurst formed the Women's Social and Political Union (WSPU) in 1903. As she put it, they viewed votes for women no longer as "a right, but as a desperate necessity". At the state level, Australia and the United States had already granted suffrage to some women. American feminists such as Susan B. Anthony (1902) visited Britain. While WSPU was the best-known suffrage group, it was only one of many, such as the Women's Freedom League and the National Union of Women's Suffrage Societies (NUWSS) led by Millicent Garrett Fawcett. WSPU was largely a family affair, although externally financed. Christabel Pankhurst became the dominant figure and gathered friends such as Annie Kenney, Flora Drummond, Teresa Billington, Ethel Smyth, Grace Roe, and Norah Dacre Fox (later known as Norah Elam) around her. Veterans such as Elizabeth Garrett also joined.

In 1906, the Daily Mail first labeled these women "suffragettes" as a form of ridicule, but the term was embraced by the women to describe the more militant form of suffragism visible in public marches, distinctive green, purple, and white emblems, and the Artists' Suffrage League's dramatic graphics. The feminists learned to exploit photography and the media, and left a vivid visual record including images such as the 1914 photograph of Emmeline.

The protests slowly became more violent, and included heckling, banging on doors, smashing shop windows, and arson. Emily Davison, a WSPU member, unexpectedly ran onto the track during the 1913 Epsom Derby and died under the King's horse. These tactics produced mixed results of sympathy and alienation. As many protesters were imprisoned and went on hunger-strike, the British government was left with an embarrassing situation. From these political actions, the suffragists successfully created publicity around their institutional discrimination and sexism.

Feminist science fiction 

At the beginning of the 20th century, feminist science fiction emerged as a subgenre of science fiction that deals with women's roles in society. Female writers of the utopian literature movement at the time of first-wave feminism often addressed sexism. Charlotte Perkins Gilman's Herland (1915) did so. Sultana's Dream (1905) by Bengali Muslim feminist Roquia Sakhawat Hussain depicts a gender-reversed purdah in a futuristic world.

During the 1920s, writers such as Clare Winger Harris and Gertrude Barrows Bennett published science fiction stories written from female perspectives and occasionally dealt with gender- and sexuality-based topics while popular 1920s and 30s pulp science fiction exaggerated masculinity alongside sexist portrayals of women. By the 1960s, science fiction combined sensationalism with political and technological critiques of society. With the advent of feminism, women's roles were questioned in this "subversive, mind expanding genre".

Feminist science fiction poses questions about social issues such as how society constructs gender roles, how reproduction defines gender, and how the political power of men and women are unequal. Some of the most notable feminist science fiction works have illustrated these themes using utopias to explore societies where gender differences or gender power imbalances do not exist, and dystopias to explore worlds where gender inequalities are escalated, asserting a need for feminist work to continue.

During the first and second world wars 

Women entered the labor market during the First World War in unprecedented numbers, often in new sectors, and discovered the value of their work. The war also left large numbers of women bereaved and with a net loss of household income. The scores of men killed and wounded shifted the demographic composition. War also split the feminist groups, with many women opposed to the war and others involved in the white feather campaign.

Feminist scholars like Françoise Thébaud and Nancy F. Cott note a conservative reaction to World War I in some countries, citing a reinforcement of traditional imagery and literature that promotes motherhood. The appearance of these traits in wartime has been called the "nationalization of women".

In the years between the wars, feminists fought discrimination and establishment opposition. In Virginia Woolf's A Room of One's Own, Woolf describes the extent of the backlash and her frustration. By now, the word "feminism" was in use, but with a negative connotation from mass media, which discouraged women from self-identifying as such. When Rebecca West, another prominent writer, had been attacked as "a feminist", Woolf defended her. West has been remembered for her comment "I myself have never been able to find out precisely what feminism is: I only know that people call me a feminist whenever I express sentiments that differentiate me from a doormat, or a prostitute."

In the 1920s, the nontraditional styles and attitudes of flappers were popular among American and British women.

Electoral reform 
The United Kingdom's Representation of the People Act 1918 gave near-universal suffrage to men, and suffrage to women over 30. The Representation of the People Act 1928 extended equal suffrage to both men and women. It also shifted the socioeconomic makeup of the electorate towards the working class, favouring the Labour Party, who were more sympathetic to women's issues.

The granting of the vote did not automatically give women the right to stand for Parliament and the Parliament (Qualification of Women) Act was rushed through just before the following election. Seventeen women were among the 1700 candidates nominated. Christabel Pankhurst narrowly failed to win a seat, and Constance Markievicz (Sinn Féin) was the first woman elected in Ireland in 1918, but as an Irish nationalist, refused to take her seat.

In 1919 and 1920, both Lady Astor and Margaret Wintringham won seats for the Conservatives and Liberals respectively by succeeding their husband's seats. Labour swept to power in 1924. Astor's proposal to form a women's party in 1929 was unsuccessful. Women gained considerable electoral experience over the next few years as a series of minority governments ensured almost annual elections. Close affiliation with Labour also proved to be a problem for the National Union of Societies for Equal Citizenship (NUSEC), which had little support in the Conservative party. However, their persistence with Prime Minister Stanley Baldwin was rewarded with the passage of the Representation of the People (Equal Franchise) Act 1928.

European women received the vote in Finland (that time still an autonomous state under Czar Russia) in 1906, in Denmark and Iceland in 1915 (full in 1919), the Russian Republic in 1917, Austria, Germany and Canada in 1918, many countries including the Netherlands in 1919, Czechoslovakia (today Czech Republic and Slovakia) in 1920, and Turkey and South Africa in 1930. French women did not receive the vote until 1945. Liechtenstein was one of the last countries, in 1984.

After French women were given the right to vote in 1945, two women's organizations were founded in the French colony of Martinique. Le Rassemblement féminin and l'Union des femmes de la Martinique both had the goal of encouraging women to vote in the upcoming elections. While  l'Union des femmes de la Martinique, founded by Jeanne Lero was influenced by beliefs, Le Rassemblement féminin, founded by Paulette Nardal, claimed to not support any particular political party and only encouraged women to take political action in order to create social change.

Social reform 
The political change did not immediately change social circumstances. With the economic recession, women were the most vulnerable sector of the workforce. Some women who held jobs prior to the war were obliged to forfeit them to returning soldiers, and others were excessed. With limited franchise, the UK National Union of Women's Suffrage Societies (NUWSS) pivoted into a new organization, the National Union of Societies for Equal Citizenship (NUSEC), which still advocated for equality in franchise, but extended its scope to examine equality in social and economic areas. Legislative reform was sought for discriminatory laws (e.g., family law and prostitution) and over the differences between equality and equity, the accommodations that would allow women to overcome barriers to fulfillment (known in later years as the "equality vs. difference conundrum"). Eleanor Rathbone, who became a British Member of Parliament in 1929, succeeded Millicent Garrett as president of NUSEC in 1919. She expressed the critical need for consideration of difference in gender relationships as "what women need to fulfill the potentialities of their own natures". The 1924 Labour government's social reforms created a formal split, as a splinter group of strict egalitarians formed the Open Door Council in May 1926. This eventually became an international movement, and continued until 1965. Other important social legislation of this period included the Sex Disqualification (Removal) Act 1919 (which opened professions to women), and the Matrimonial Causes Act 1923. In 1932, NUSEC separated advocacy from education, and continued the former activities as the National Council for Equal Citizenship and the latter as the Townswomen's Guild. The council continued until the end of the Second World War.

Reproductive rights 

British laws prevented feminists from discussing and addressing reproductive rights. Annie Besant was tried under the Obscene Publications Act 1857 in 1877 for publishing Charles Knowlton's Fruits of Philosophy, a work on family planning. Knowlton had previously been convicted in the United States. She and her colleague Charles Bradlaugh were convicted but acquitted on appeal. The subsequent publicity resulted in a decline in the UK's birth rate. Besant later wrote The Law of Population.

In America, Margaret Sanger was prosecuted for her book Family Limitation under the Comstock Act in 1914, and fled to Britain until it was safe to return. Sanger's work was prosecuted in Britain. She met Marie Stopes in Britain, who was never prosecuted but regularly denounced for her promotion of birth control. In 1917, Sanger started the Birth Control Review. In 1926, Sanger gave a lecture on birth control to the women's auxiliary of the Ku Klux Klan in Silver Lake, New Jersey, which she referred to as a "weird experience". The establishment of the Abortion Law Reform Association in 1936 was even more controversial. The British penalty for abortion had been reduced from execution to life imprisonment by the Offences against the Person Act 1861, although some exceptions were allowed in the Infant Life (Preservation) Act 1929. Following Aleck Bourne's prosecution in 1938, the 1939 Birkett Committee made recommendations for reform that were set aside at the Second World War's outbreak, along with many other women's issues.

In the Netherlands, Aletta H. Jacobs, the first Dutch female doctor, and Wilhelmina Drucker led discussion and action for reproductive rights. Jacobs imported diaphragms from Germany and distributed them to poor women for free.

1940s 
In most front line countries, women volunteered or were conscripted for various duties in support of the national war effort. In Britain, women were drafted and assigned to industrial jobs or to non-combat military service. The British services enrolled 460,000 women. The largest service, Auxiliary Territorial Service, had a maximum of 213,000 women enrolled, many of whom served in anti-aircraft gun combat roles. In many countries, including Germany and the Soviet Union, women volunteered or were conscripted. In Germany, women volunteered in the League of German Girls and assisted the Luftwaffe as anti-aircraft gunners, or as guerrilla fighters in Werwolf units behind Allied lines. In the Soviet Union, about 820,000 women served in the military as medics, radio operators, truck drivers, snipers, combat pilots, and junior commanding officers.

Many American women retained their domestic chores and often added a paid job, especially one related to a war industry. Much more so than in the previous war, large numbers of women were hired for unskilled or semi-skilled jobs in munitions, and barriers against married women taking jobs were eased. The popular Rosie the Riveter icon became a symbol for a generation of American working women. In addition, some 300,000 women served in U.S. military uniform with organizations such as Women's Army Corps and WAVES. With many young men gone, sports organizers tried to set up professional women's teams, such as the All-American Girls Professional Baseball League, which closed after the war. After the war, most munitions plants closed, and civilian plants replaced their temporary female workers with returning veterans, who had priority.

Second wave 

"Second-wave feminism" identifies a period of feminist activity from the early 1960s through the late 1980s that saw cultural and political inequalities as inextricably linked. The movement encouraged women to understand aspects of their personal lives as deeply politicized and reflective of a sexist power structure. As first-wave feminists focused on absolute rights such as suffrage, second-wave feminists focused on other cultural equality issues, such as ending discrimination.

Betty Friedan, The Feminine Mystique, and Women's Liberation 
A landmark feminist work appeared in 1949 called The Second Sex, a book written by Simone de Beauvoir. The critical text pertained to every facet of what would later be defined as gender discourse. Beauvoir goes into detail on the treatment of women throughout entire history of the world and analyses the modes of oppression enforced by patriarchy and then critiques it. In 1963, Betty Friedan's exposé The Feminine Mystique became the voice for the discontent and disorientation women felt in being shunted into homemaking positions after their college graduations. In the book, Friedan explored the roots of the change in women's roles from essential workforce during World War II to homebound housewife and mother after the war, and assessed the forces that drove this change in perception of women's roles.

The expression "Women's Liberation" has been used to refer to feminism throughout history. "Liberation" has been associated with feminist aspirations since 1895, and appears in the context of "women's liberation" in Simone de Beauvoir's 1949 The Second Sex, which appeared in English translation in 1953. The phrase "women's liberation" was first used in 1964, in print in 1966, though the French equivalent, libération des femmes, occurred as far back as 1911. "Women's liberation" was in use at the 1967 American Students for a Democratic Society (SDS) convention, which held a panel discussion on the topic. In 1968, the term "Women's Liberation Front" appeared in Ramparts magazine, and began to refer to the whole women's movement. In Chicago, women disillusioned with the New Left met separately in 1967, and published Voice of the Women's Liberation Movement in March 1968. When the Miss America pageant took place in Atlantic City in September 1968, the media referred to the resulting demonstrations as "Women's Liberation". The Chicago Women's Liberation Union was formed in 1969. Similar groups with similar titles appeared in many parts of the United States. Bra-burning, although fictional, became associated with the movement, and the media coined other terms such as "libber". "Women's Liberation" persisted over the other rival terms for the new feminism, captured the popular imagination, and has endured alongside the older term "Women's Movement".

This time was marked by increased female enrolment in higher education, the establishment of academic women's studies courses and departments, and feminist ideology in other related fields, such as politics, sociology, history, and literature. This academic shift in interests questioned the status quo, and its standards and authority.

The rise of the Women's Liberation movement revealed "multiple feminisms", or different underlying feminist lenses, due to the diverse origins from which groups had coalesced and intersected, and the complexity and contentiousness of the issues involved. bell hooks is noted as a prominent critic of the movement for its lack of voice given to the most oppressed women, its lack of emphasis on the inequalities of race and class, and its distance from the issues that divide women. Helen Reddy's "I Am Woman", John Lennon's "Woman is the Nigger of the World" and Yoko Ono's "Josei Joui Banzai" were 70s feminist songs. Feminist's wrong protest against rock music movement was started in Los Angeles, where Women Against Violence Against Women was founded in 1976; they campaigned against the Rolling Stones' 1976 album Black and Blue.

Feminist writing 

Empowered by The Feminine Mystique, new feminist activists of the 1970s addressed more political and sexual issues in their writing, including Gloria Steinem's Ms. magazine and Kate Millett's Sexual Politics. Millett's bleak survey of male writers, their attitudes and biases, to demonstrate that sex is politics, and politics is power imbalance in relationships.  Shulamith Firestone's The Dialectic of Sex described a revolution based in Marxism, referenced as the "sex war". Considering the debates over patriarchy, she claimed that male domination dated to "back beyond recorded history to the animal kingdom itself".

Germaine Greer's The Female Eunuch, Sheila Rowbotham's Women's Liberation and the New Politics, and Juliet Mitchell's Woman's Estate represent the English perspective. Mitchell argued that the movement should be seen as an international phenomenon with different manifestations based on local culture. British women drew on left-wing politics and organized small local discussion groups, partly through the London Women's Liberation Workshop and its publications, Shrew and the LWLW Newsletter. Although there were marches, the focus was on consciousness-raising, or political activism intended to bring a cause or condition to a wider audience. Kathie Sarachild of Redstockings described its function as such that women would "find what they thought was an individual dilemma is social predicament".

Meanwhile, in the U.S., women's frustrations crystallized around the failure to ratify the Equal Rights Amendment during the 1970s. Susan Brownmiller's 1975 Against Our Will introduced an explicit agenda against male violence, specifically male sexual violence, in a treatise on rape. Her assertion that "pornography is the theory and rape the practice" created deep fault lines around the concepts of objectification and commodification. Brownmiller's other major book, In our Time (2000), is a history of women's liberation.

In Academic circles, feminist theology was a growing interest. Phyllis Trible wrote extensively throughout the 1970s to critique biblical interpretation of the time, using a type of critique known as Rhetorical criticism. Trible's analysis of biblical text seeks to explain that the bible itself is not sexist, but that it is centuries of sexism in societies that have produced this narrative.

Feminist views on pornography 

Susan Griffin was one of the first feminists to write on pornography's implications in her 1981 Pornography and Silence. Beyond Brownmiller and Griffin's positions, Catharine MacKinnon and Andrea Dworkin influenced debates and activism around pornography and prostitution, particularly at the Supreme Court of Canada. MacKinnon, a lawyer, has stated, "To be about to be raped is to be gender female in the process of going about life as usual." She explained sexual harassment by saying that it "doesn't mean that they [harassers] all want to fuck us, they just want to hurt us, dominate us, and control us, and that is fucking us." According to Pauline B. Bart, some people see radical feminism as the only movement that truly expresses the pain of being a woman in an unequal society, as it portrays that reality with the experiences of the battered and violated, which they claim to be the norm. Critics, including some feminists, civil libertarians, and jurists, have found this position uncomfortable and alienating.

This approach has evolved to transform the research and perspective on rape from an individual experience into a social problem.

Third wave 

Third-wave feminism began in the early 1990s in response to what young women perceived as failures of the second-wave. It also responds to the backlash against the second-wave's initiatives and movements. Third-wave feminism seeks to challenge or avoid second-wave "essentialist" definitions of femininity, which over-emphasized the experiences of white, upper-middle-class women. A post-structuralist interpretation of gender and sexuality, or an understanding of gender as outside binary maleness and femaleness, is central to much of the third wave's ideology. Third-wave feminists often describe "micropolitics", and challenge second-wave paradigms about whether actions are unilaterally good for females.

These aspects of third-wave feminism arose in the mid-1980s. Feminist leaders rooted in the second wave like Gloria Anzaldúa, bell hooks, Chela Sandoval, Cherríe Moraga, Audre Lorde, Luisa Accati, Maxine Hong Kingston, and many other feminists of color, called for a new subjectivity in feminist voice. They wanted prominent feminist thought to consider race-related subjectivities. This focus on the intersection between race and gender remained prominent through the 1991 Hill–Thomas hearings, but began to shift with the Freedom Ride 1992, a drive to register voters in poor minority communities whose rhetoric intended to rally young feminists. For many, the rallying of the young is the common link within third-wave feminism.

Sexual politics 
Lesbianism during the second wave was visible within and without feminism. Lesbians felt sidelined by both gay liberation and women's liberation, where they were referred to as the "Lavender Menace", provoking The Woman-Identified Woman, a 1970 manifesto that put lesbian women at the forefront of the liberation movement. Jill Johnston's 1973 Lesbian Nation: The Feminist Solution argued for lesbian separatism. In its extreme form, this was expressed as the only appropriate choice for a woman. Eventually the lesbian movement was welcomed into the mainstream women's movement. This union's threat to male normativity was substantiated by the male backlash that followed.

In reproductive rights, feminists sought the right to contraception and birth control, which were almost universally restricted until the 1960s. Feminists hoped to use the first birth control pill to free women to decide the terms under which they will bear children. They felt that reproductive self-control was essential for full economic independence from men. Access to abortion was also widely demanded for these reasons, but was more difficult to secure due to existing, deep societal divisions over the issue. Although Shulamith Firestone was active during the second wave of feminism, her views on reproductive technology have connections to reproductive rights. Firestone believed in the enhancement of technologically concerning reproduction, in order to eliminate the obligation for women to reproduce and end oppression and inequality against them. Enhancing technology to empower women and abolish the gender hierarchy are the main focuses of a newer developing philosophy in feminism, known as cyberfeminism. Cyberfeminism has strong ties to reproductive rights and technology.

Third-wave feminists also fought to hasten social acceptance of female sexual freedom. As societal norms allowed men to have multiple sexual partners without rebuke, feminists sought sexual equality for that freedom and encouraged "sexual liberation" for women, including sex for pleasure with multiple partners, if desired.

Global feminism

UN conferences on women 

In 1946, the United Nations established a Commission on the Status of Women, which later joined the UN Economic and Social Council (ECOSOC). In 1948, the UN issued its Universal Declaration of Human Rights, which protects "the equal rights of men and women", and addressed both equality and equity. Starting with the 1975 World Conference of the International Women's Year in Mexico City as part of their Decade for Women (1975–1985), the UN has held a series of world conferences on women's issues. These conferences have worldwide female representation and provide considerable opportunity to advance women's rights. They also illustrate deep cultural divisions and disagreement on universal principles, as evidenced by the successive Copenhagen (1980) and Nairobi (1985) conferences. Examples of such intrafeminism divisions have included disparities between economic development, attitudes towards forms of oppression, the definition of feminism, and stances on homosexuality, female circumcision, and population control. The Nairobi convention revealed a less monolithic feminism that "constitutes the political expression of the concerns and interests of women from different regions, classes, nationalities, and ethnic backgrounds. There is and must be a diversity of feminisms, responsive to the different needs and concerns of women, and defined by them for themselves. This diversity builds on a common opposition to gender oppression and hierarchy which, however, is only the first step in articulating and acting upon a political agenda." The fourth conference was held in Beijing in 1995, where the Beijing Platform for Action was signed. This included a commitment to achieve "gender equality and the empowerment of women" through "gender mainstreaming", or letting women and men "experience equal conditions for realising their full human rights, and have the opportunity to contribute and benefit from national, political, economic, social and cultural development".

Bridging East and West 

"The definitional moment of third-wave feminism has been theorized as proceeding from critiques of the white women’s movement that were initiated by women of color, as well as from the many instances of coalition work undertaken by U.S. third world feminists" Third world feminists since the 1980s have been critics of class-bias, racism, and Eurocentrism among women and feminists, and theories of multiplicity and difference given by these feminists such as Sandoval, Minh-ha, and Mohanty have enabled young feminists to dismantle the idea of monolithic feminism. They have empowered them to recognize the differences and declare multiple identities of being female, despite constantly feeling caught between modernity and tradition. Even though Asian women found it difficult to relate completely with the western women's white problems, they related much with the women of color, and thus remolded it and built a bridge between both halves of feminism, the eastern and western, via interconnectedness among women around the world. They adapted and borrowed the 'western' ideas of feminism and women in the west incorporated the effects of women's movements in other parts of the world, while reinventing itself. Asian feminists acknowledged the need of recognizing multiple sources of domination in women’s lives all across the world, refused to universalize women’s experience as one, and instead recognized the differences among them due to different social locations. They claimed that although academic feminism introduced them to the idea of feminism, it failed to bring them closer to the sisters and mothers in their lives, and rather took them further away. Some have also argued that many goals of western feminism are not enough to assess women’s progress in Asia because they are not necessarily relevant or exportable across the boundaries. Thus, they redefined it as one that drew upon their heritage, history, and experiences. As Grewal puts it, "These transnational feminist scholars enable us to rethink the way we construct and write the history of feminists in national and transnational contexts. Seeking to articulate transnational connections among women, they have suggested ways to move beyond constructed oppositions without ignoring the histories that informed these conflicts or the valid concerns about power relations that have represented or structured the conflicts up to this point."

Fourth wave 

Fourth-wave feminism is a recent development within the feminist movement. Jennifer Baumgardner identifies fourth-wave feminism as starting in 2008 and continuing into the present day. Kira Cochrane, author of  All the Rebel Women: The Rise of the Fourth Wave of Feminism, defines fourth-wave feminism as a movement that is connected through technology. Researcher Diana Diamond defines fourth-wave feminism as a movement that "combines politics, psychology, and spirituality in an overarching vision of change."

Arguments for a new wave 
In 2005, Pythia Peay first argued for the existence of a fourth wave of feminism, combining justice with religious spirituality. According to Jennifer Baumgardner in 2011, a fourth wave, incorporating online resources such as social media, may have begun in 2008, inspired partly by Take Our Daughters to Work Days. This fourth wave in turn has inspired or been associated with: the Doula Project for children's services; post-abortion talk lines; pursuit of reproductive justice; plus-size fashion support; support for transgender rights; male feminism; sex work acceptance; and developing media including Feministing, Racialicious, blogs, and Twitter campaigns.

According to Kira Cochrane, a fourth wave had appeared in the U.K. and several other nations by 2012–13. It focused on: sexual inequality as manifested in "street harassment, sexual harassment, workplace discrimination[,] ... body-shaming"; media images, "online misogyny", "assault[s] on public transport"; on intersectionality; on social media technology for communication and online petitioning for organizing; and on the perception, inherited from prior waves, that individual experiences are shared and thus can have political solutions. Cochrane identified as fourth wave such organizations and websites as the Everyday Sexism Project and UK Feminista; and events such as Reclaim the Night, One Billion Rising, and "a Lose the Lads' mags protest", where "many of [the leaders] ... are in their teens and 20s".

In 2014, Betty Dodson, who is also acknowledged as one of the leaders of the early 1980s pro-sex feminist movement, expressed that she considers herself a fourth wave feminist. Dodson expressed that the previous waves of feminist were banal and anti-sexual, which is why she has chosen to look at a new stance of feminism, fourth wave feminism. In 2014, Dodson worked with women to discover their sexual desires through masturbation. Dodson says her work has gained a fresh lease of life with a new audience of young, successful women who have never had an orgasm. This includes fourth-wave feminists - those rejecting the anti-pleasure stance they believe third-wave feminists stand for.

In 2014, Rhiannon Lucy Cosslett and Holly Baxter released their book, The Vagenda. The authors of the book both consider themselves fourth wave feminists. Like their website "The Vagenda", their book aims to flag and debunk the stereotypes of femininity promoted by the mainstream women's press. One reviewer of the book has expressed disappointment with The Vagenda, saying that instead of being the "call to arms for young women" that it purports to be, it reads like a joyless dissertation detailing "everything bad the media has ever done to women."

The Everyday Sexism Project 
The Everyday Sexism Project began as a social media campaign on 16 April 2012 by Laura Bates, a British feminist writer. The aim of the site was to document everyday examples of sexism as reported by contributors around the world. Bates established the Everyday Sexism Project as an open forum where women could post their experiences of harassment.  Bates explains the Everyday Sexism Project's goal, ""The project was never about solving sexism. It was about getting people to take the first step of just realising there is a problem that needs to be fixed."

The website was such a success that Bates decided to write and publish a book, Everyday Sexism, which further emphasizes the importance of having this type of online forum for women. The book provides unique insight into the vibrant movement of the upcoming fourth wave and the untold stories that women shared through the Everyday Sexism Project.

Click! The Ongoing Feminist Revolution 

In November 2015, a group of historians working with Clio Visualizing History  launched Click! The Ongoing Feminist Revolution. This digital history exhibit examines the history of American feminism from the era of World War Two to the present. The exhibit has three major sections: Politics and Social Movements; Body and Health; and Workplace and Family. There are also interactive timelines linking to a vast array of sources documenting the history of American feminism and providing information about current feminist activism.

Criticisms of the wave metaphor 
In the 1960s, feminists described their movements as the "second wave" of feminism. As the second wave emerges, the importance of this new wave was to revisit that the current women's right had a venerable past. This wave focused on the idea that these movements were a long tradition of activism and during the second wave, feminists began to rewrite U.S. history through recognizing that the suffrage movement was part of the nineteenth century movement around women's issues. Presently, many contributions about the Second Wave Feminism was correlated with "hegemonic feminism". This feminism views sexism as the main oppression and it was mainly led by white individuals who "marginalized the activism and world views of women of color". Women of color and white antiracist women clarify the rise of multiracial feminism through telling the history of the Second Wave feminism. One of the earlier feminist organizations of the Second Wave was a Chicana group named Hijas de Cuauntemoc (1971) which was named after a underground newspaper written by women during the 1910 Mexican Revolution. Multiple other feminist organizations that were created in the early 1970s with Black, Asian, Latina, and Native American women have created a nationalist tradition of sending out a message that there is a need for people of color-led, independent organizations.

During the 1990s, the United States feminist activity that was present in the 1960s through the 1980s was no longer expressed. The wave metaphor for the Second Wave showed the 1960s movement as anything other than a historical situation, and showed that the nineteenth century movement was a bigger deal and had more impact on history than what was taught. As many pondered on what state was feminism presently in, one idea emerged in the early 1990s as the "third wave". As emerging from the Second Wave and onto the Third Wave, the wave metaphor has reached its usefulness. Individuals are more aware of the significance the nineteenth century had on women's movement and are more aware of the emergence the 1960s had from their long struggle regarding women's issues.

National histories of feminism

France 

The 18th century French Revolution's focus on égalité (equality) extended to the inequities faced by French women. The writer Olympe de Gouges amended the 1791 Declaration of the Rights of Man and of the Citizen into the Declaration of the Rights of Woman and of the Female Citizen, where she argued that women accountable to the law must also bear equal responsibility under the law. She also addressed marriage as a social contract between equals and attacked women's reliance on beauty and charm as a form of slavery. Two years later, she was executed by guillotine. 

The 19th century, conservative, post-Revolution France was inhospitable for feminist ideas, as expressed in the counter-revolutionary writings on the role of women by Joseph de Maistre and Viscount Louis de Bonald. Advancement came mid-century under the 1848 revolution and the proclamation of the Second Republic, which introduced male suffrage amid hopes that similar benefits would apply to women. Although the Utopian Charles Fourier is considered a feminist writer of this period, his influence was minimal at the time. With the fall of the conservative Louis-Philippe in 1848, feminist hopes were raised, as in 1790. Movement newspapers and organizations appeared, such as Eugénie Niboyet's La Voix des Femmes (The Women's Voice), the first feminist daily newspaper in France. Niboyet was a Protestant who had adopted Saint-Simonianism, and La Voix attracted other women from that movement, including the seamstress Jeanne Deroin and the primary schoolteacher Pauline Roland. Unsuccessful attempts were also made to recruit George Sand. Feminism was treated as a threat due to its ties with socialism, which was scrutinized since the Revolution. Deroin and Roland were both arrested, tried, and imprisoned in 1849. With the emergence of a new, more conservative government in 1852, feminism would have to wait until the Third French Republic.

While the word féminisme previously existed to describe the qualities of women, the word féministe was coined in 1872 by Alexandre Dumas fils to refer to liberated women.

The Groupe Français d'Etudes Féministes were women intellectuals at the beginning of the 20th century who translated part of Bachofen's canon into French and campaigned for the family law reform. In 1905, they founded L'entente, which published articles on women's history, and became the focus for the intellectual avant-garde. It advocated for women's entry into higher education and the male-dominated professions. Meanwhile, the Parti Socialiste Féminin socialist feminists, adopted a Marxist version of matriarchy. Like the Groupe Français, they toiled for a new age of equality, not for a return to prehistoric models of matriarchy. French feminism of the late 20th century is mainly associated with psychoanalytic feminist theory, particularly the work of Luce Irigaray, Julia Kristeva, and Hélène Cixous.

Germany 

Modern feminism in Germany began during the Wilhelmine period (1888–1918) with feminists pressuring a range of traditional institutions, from universities to government, to open their doors to women. The organized German women's movement is widely attributed to writer and feminist Louise Otto-Peters (1819–1895). This movement culminated in women's suffrage in 1919. Later waves of feminists continued to ask for legal and social equality in public and family life. Alice Schwarzer is the most prominent contemporary German feminist.

Iran 

The Iranian women's rights movement first emerged some time after the Iranian Constitutional Revolution, in the year in which the first women's journal was published, 1910. The status of women deteriorated after the 1979 Iranian Revolution. The movement later grew again under feminist figures such as Bibi Khanoom Astarabadi, Touba Azmoudeh, Sediqeh Dowlatabadi, Mohtaram Eskandari, Roshank No'doost, Afaq Parsa, Fakhr ozma Arghoun, Shahnaz Azad, Noor-ol-Hoda Mangeneh, Zandokht Shirazi, Maryam Amid (Mariam Mozayen-ol Sadat).

In 1992, Shahla Sherkat founded Zanan (Women) magazine, which covered Iranian women's concerns and tested political boundaries with edgy reportage on reform politics, domestic abuse, and sex. It is the most important Iranian women's journal published after the Iranian revolution. It systematically criticized the Islamic legal code and argued that gender equality is Islamic and religious literature had been misread and misappropriated by misogynists. Mehangiz Kar, Shahla Lahiji, and Shahla Sherkat, the editor of Zanan, lead the debate on women's rights and demanded reforms. On August 27, 2006, the One Million Signatures Iranian women's rights campaign was started. It aims to end legal discrimination against women in Iranian laws by collecting a million signatures. The campaign supporters include many Iranian women's rights activists, international activists, and Nobel laureates. The most important post-revolution feminist figures are Mehrangiz Kar, Azam Taleghani, Shahla Sherkat, Parvin Ardalan, Noushin Ahmadi khorasani, and Shadi Sadr.

Egypt 

In 1899, Qasim Amin, considered the "father" of Arab feminism, wrote The Liberation of Women, which argued for legal and social reforms for women. Hoda Shaarawi founded the Egyptian Feminist Union in 1923 and became its president and a symbol of the Arab women's rights movement. Arab feminism was closely connected with Arab nationalism. In 1956, President Gamal Abdel Nasser's government initiated "state feminism", which outlawed gender-based discrimination and granted women's suffrage. Despite these reforms, "state feminism" blocked feminist political activism and brought an end to the first-wave feminist movement in Egypt. During Anwar Sadat's presidency, his wife, Jehan Sadat, publicly advocated for expansion of women's rights, though Egyptian policy and society was in retreat from women's equality with the new Islamist movement and growing conservatism. However, writers such as Al Ghazali Harb, for example, argued that women's full equality is an important part of Islam. This position formed a new feminist movement, Islamic feminism, which is still active today.

India 

A new generation of Indian feminists emerged following global feminism. Indian women have greater independence from increased access to higher education and control over their reproductive rights. Medha Patkar, Madhu Kishwar, and Brinda Karat are feminist social workers and politicians who advocate for women's rights in post-independence India. Writers such as Amrita Pritam, Sarojini Sahoo, and Kusum Ansal advocate for feminist ideas in Indian languages. Rajeshwari Sunder Rajan, Leela Kasturi, and Vidyut Bhagat are Indian feminist essayists and critics writing in English.

China 
 Feminism in China began in the late Qing period as Chinese society re-evaluated traditional and Confucian values such as foot binding and gender segregation, and began to reject traditional gender ideas as hindering progress towards modernization. During the 1898 Hundred Days' Reform, reformers called for women's education, gender equality, and the end of foot binding. Female reformers formed the first Chinese women's society, the Society for the Diffusion of Knowledge among Chinese Women (Nüxuehui). After the Qing Dynasty's collapse, women's liberation became a goal of the May Fourth Movement and the New Culture Movement. Later, the Chinese Communist Revolution adopted women's liberation as one of its aims and promoted women's equality, especially regarding women's participation in the workforce. After the revolution and progress in integrating women into the workforce, the Chinese Communist Party claimed to have successfully achieved women's liberation, and women's inequality was no longer seen as a problem.

Second- and third-wave feminism in China was characterized by a re-examination of women's roles during the reform movements of the early 20th century and the ways in which feminism was adopted by those various movements in order to achieve their goals. Later and current feminists have questioned whether gender equality has actually been fully achieved, and discuss current gender problems, such as the large gender disparity in the population.

Japan 

Japanese feminism as an organized political movement dates back to the early years of the 20th century when Kato Shidzue pushed for birth control availability as part of a broad spectrum of progressive reforms. Shidzue went on to serve in the National Diet following the defeat of Japan in World War II and the promulgation of the Peace Constitution by US forces. Other figures such as Hayashi Fumiko and Ariyoshi Sawako illustrate the broad socialist ideologies of Japanese feminism that seeks to accomplish broad goals rather than celebrate the individual achievements of powerful women.

Norway 

Norwegian feminism's political origins are in the women's suffrage movement. Camilla Collett (1813–1895) is widely considered the first Norwegian feminist. Originating from a literary family, she wrote a novel and several articles on the difficulties facing women of her time, and, in particular, forced marriages. Amalie Skram (1846–1905), a naturalist writer, also served as the women's voice.

The Norwegian Association for Women's Rights was founded in 1884 by Gina Krog and Hagbart Berner. The organization raised issues related to women's rights to education and economic self-determination, and, above all, universal suffrage. The Norwegian Parliament passed the women's right to vote into law on June 11, 1913. Norway was the second country in Europe (after Finland) to have full suffrage for women.

Poland 

The development of feminism in Poland (re-recreated in modern times in 1918) and Polish territories has traditionally been divided into seven successive "waves".

Radical feminism emerged in 1920s Poland. Its chief representatives, Irena Krzywicka and Maria Morozowicz-Szczepkowska, advocated for women's personal, social, and legal independence from men. Krzywicka and Tadeusz Żeleński both promoted planned parenthood, sexual education, rights to divorce and abortion, and equality of sexes. Krzywicka published a series of articles in Wiadomości Literackie in which she protested against interference by the Roman Catholic Church in the intimate lives of Poles.

After the Second World War, the Polish Communist state (established in 1948) forcefully promoted women's emancipation at home and at work. However, during Communist rule (until 1989), feminism in general and second-wave feminism in particular were practically absent. Although feminist texts were produced in the 1950s and afterwards, they were usually controlled and generated by the Communist state. After the fall of Communism, the Polish government, dominated by Catholic political parties, introduced a de facto legal ban on abortions. Since then, some feminists have adopted argumentative strategies from the 1980s American pro-choice movement.

Histories of selected feminist issues

Feminist theory 

The sexuality and gender historian Nancy Cott distinguishes between modern feminism and its antecedents, particularly the struggle for suffrage. She argues that in the two decades surrounding the Nineteenth Amendment's 1920 passage, the prior woman movement primarily concerned women as universal entities, whereas over this 20-year period, the movement prioritized social differentiation, attention to individuality, and diversity. New issues dealt more with gender as a social construct, gender identity, and relationships within and between genders. Politically, this represented a shift from an ideological alignment comfortable with the right, to one more radically associated with the left.

In the immediate postwar period, Simone de Beauvoir opposed the "woman in the home" norm. She introduced an existentialist dimension to feminism with the publication of Le Deuxième Sexe (The Second Sex) in 1949. While less an activist than a philosopher and novelist, she signed one of the Mouvement de Libération des Femmes manifestos.

The resurgence of feminist activism in the late 1960s was accompanied by an emerging literature of what might be considered female-associated issues, such as concerns for the earth, spirituality, and environmental activism. The atmosphere this created reignited the study of and debate on matricentricity as a rejection of determinism, such as with Adrienne Rich in Of Woman Born and Marilyn French in Beyond Power. For socialist feminists like Evelyn Reed, patriarchy held the properties of capitalism.

Ann Taylor Allen describes the differences between the collective male pessimism of male intellectuals such as Ferdinand Tönnies, Max Weber, and Georg Simmel at the beginning of the 20th century, compared to the optimism of their female counterparts, whose contributions have largely been ignored by social historians of the era.

See also 

 Coverture
 History of brassieres
Lesbian erasure
 List of suffragists and suffragettes
 List of women's rights activists
 List of women's organizations
 Mujeres Libres
 New Woman
 Timeline of second-wave feminism
 Timeline of women's suffrage
 Timeline of women's rights (other than voting)
 Victorian dress reform
 Women's music
 Women's suffrage organizations
 Women's rights in 2014
 1975 Icelandic women's strike

References

Bibliography

General

Books 
 Cott, Nancy F. The Bonds of Womanhood. New Haven: Yale University Press, 1977.
 Cott, Nancy F. The Grounding of Modern Feminism. New Haven: Yale University Press, 1987.
 Duby, George and Perrot, Michelle (eds). A History of Women in the West. 5 vols. Harvard, 1992-4
 I. From Ancient Goddesses to Christian Saints
 II. Silences of the Middle Ages
 III. Renaissance and the Enlightenment Paradoxes
 IV. Emerging Feminism from Revolution to World War
 V. Toward a Cultural Identity in the Twentieth Century
 Ezell, Margaret J. M. Writing Women's Literary History. Johns Hopkins University, 2006. 216 pp. 
 Foot, Paul. The Vote: How it was won and how it was lost. London: Viking, 2005
 Freedman, Estelle No Turning Back: The History of Feminism and the Future of Women, Ballantine Books, 2002, 
 Fulford, Roger. Votes for Women. London: Faber and Faber, 1957
 Jacob, Margaret C. The Enlightenment: A Brief History With Documents, Bedford/St. Martin's, 2001, 
 Kramarae, Cheris and Paula Treichler. A Feminist Dictionary. University of Illinois, 1997. 
 Lerner, Gerda. The Creation of Feminist Consciousness From the Middle Ages to Eighteen-seventy. Oxford University Press, 1993
 McQuiston, Liz. Suffragettes and She-devils: Women's liberation and beyond. London: Phaidon, 1997
 Mill, John Stuart. The Subjection of Women. Okin, Susan M (ed.). Newhaven, CT: Yale, 1985
 Prince, Althea and Susan Silva-Wayne (eds). Feminisms and Womanisms: A Women's Studies Reader. Women's Press, 2004. 
 Radical Women. The Radical Women Manifesto: Socialist Feminist Theory, Program and Organizational Structure. Red Letter Press, 2001. 
 Rossi, Alice S. The Feminist Papers: from Adams to Beauvoir. Boston: Northeastern University, 1973. 
 Rowbotham, Sheilah. A Century of Women. Viking, London 1997
 Schneir, Miriam. Feminism: The Essential Historical Writings. Vintage, 1994. 
 Scott, Joan Wallach Feminism and History (Oxford Readings in Feminism), Oxford University Press, 1996, 
 Smith, Bonnie G. Global Feminisms: A Survey of Issues and Controversies (Rewriting Histories), Routledge, 2000, 
 Spender, Dale (ed.). Feminist Theorists: Three centuries of key women thinkers, Pantheon, 1983,

Articles 
 Allen, Ann Taylor. "Feminism, Social Science, and the Meanings of Modernity: The Debate on the Origin of the Family in Europe and the United States, 1860–1914". The American Historical Review, 1999 October 104(4)
 Cott, Nancy F. "Feminist Politics in the 1920s: The National Woman's Party". Journal of American History 71 (June 1984): 43–68.
 Cott, Nancy F. "What's In a Name? The Limits of 'Social Feminism'; or, Expanding the Vocabulary of Women's History". Journal of American History 76 (December 1989): 809–829.
 
 Offen, Karen. "Defining Feminism: A Comparative Historical Approach". Signs 1988 Autumn 14(1):119-57

International 
 Parpart, Jane L., Conelly, M. Patricia, Barriteau, V. Eudine (eds). Theoretical Perspectives on Gender and Development. Ottawa: IDRC, 2000.

Europe 
 Anderson, Bonnie S. and Judith P. Zinsser. A History of Their Own: Women in Europe from Prehistory to the Present, Oxford University Press, 1999 (revised edition), 
 Offen, Karen M. European Feminisms, 1700–1950: A Political History. Stanford: Stanford University Press. 2000
 Perincioli, Cristina. Berlin wird feministisch. Das Beste, was von der 68er-Bewegung blieb. Querverlag, Berlin 2015, free access to complete English translation: http://feministberlin1968ff.de/

Great Britain
 Caine, Barbara. Victorian Feminists. Oxford, 1992
 Chandrasekhar, S. "A Dirty, Filfthy Book": The Writing of Charles Knowlton and Annie Besant on Reproductive Physiology and British Control and an Account of the Bradlaugh-Besant Trial. University of California Berkeley, 1981
 Craik, Elizabeth M. (ed.). "Women and Marriage in Victorian England", in Marriage and Property. Aberdeen University, 1984
 Forster, Margaret. Significant Sisters: The grassroots of active feminism 1839-1939. Penguin, 1986
 Fraser, Antonia. The Weaker Vessel. NY: Vintage, 1985. 
 Hallam, David J.A., Taking on the Men: the first women parliamentary candidates 1918 , Studley, 2018 
 Manvell, Roger. The Trial of Annie Besant and Charles Bradlaugh. London: Elek, 1976
 Pankhurst, Emmeline. My Own Story. London: Virago, 1979
 Pankhurst, Sylvia. The Suffragette Movement. London: Virago, 1977
 Phillips, Melanie. The Ascent of Woman – A History of the Suffragette Movement and the ideas behind it, London: Time Warner Book Group, 2003, 
 Pugh, Martin. Women and the Women's Movement in Britain, 1914 -1999, Basingstoke [etc.]: St. Martin's Press, 2000
 Walters, Margaret. Feminism: A very short introduction. Oxford, 2005

Italy
 Lucia Chiavola Birnbaum, Liberazione della Donna. Feminism in Italy, Wesleyan University Press, 1986

India
 Maitrayee Chaudhuri (ed.), Feminism in India, London [etc.]: Zed Books, 2005

Iran
 Edward G. Browne, The Persian Revolution of 1905-1909. Mage Publishers (July 1995). 
 Farideh Farhi, "Religious Intellectuals, the "Woman Question," and the Struggle for the Creation of a Democratic Public Sphere in Iran", International Journal of Politics, Culture and Society, Vol. 15, No.2, Winter 2001.
 Ziba Mir-Hosseini, "Religious Modernists and the 'Woman Question': Challenges and Complicities", Twenty Years of Islamic Revolution: Political and Social Transition in Iran since 1979, Syracuse University Press, 2002, pp 74–95.
 Shirin Ebadi, Iran Awakening: A Memoir of Revolution and Hope, Random House (May 2, 2006),

Japan
 Vera Mackie, Feminism in Modern Japan: Citizenship, Embodiment and Sexuality, Paperback edition, Cambridge University Press, 2003,

Latin America
 Nancy Sternbach, "Feminism in Latin America: from Bogotá to San Bernardo", in: Signs, Winter 1992, pp. 393–434

United States
 Brownmiller, Susan. In Our Time: Memoir of a Revolution, Dial Books, 1999
 Cott, Nancy and Elizabeth Pleck (eds), A Heritage of Her Own; Toward a New Social History of American Women, New York: Simon and Schuster, 1979
 Echols, Alice. Daring to Be Bad: Radical Feminism in America, 1967-1975, University of Minnesota Press, 1990
 Flexner, Eleanor. Century of Struggle: The Woman's Rights Movement in the United States, Paperback Edition, Belknap Press 1996
 Fox-Genovese, Elizabeth., "Feminism Is Not the Story of My Life": How Today's Feminist Elite Has Lost Touch With the Real Concerns of Women, Doubleday, 1996
 Keetley, Dawn (ed.) Public Women, Public Words: A Documentary History of American Feminism. 3 vols.:
 Vol. 1: Beginnings to 1900, Madison, Wisconsin: Madison House, 1997
 Vol. 2: 1900 to 1960, Lanham, Md. [etc.]: Rowman & Littlefield, 2002
 Vol. 3: 1960 to the present, Lanham, Md. [etc.]: Rowman & Littlefield, 2002
 Messer-Davidow, Ellen: Disciplining feminism: from social activism to academic discourse, Duke University Press, 2002
 O'Neill, William L. Everyone Was Brave: A history of feminism in America. Chicago 1971
 Roth, Benita. Separate Roads to Feminism: Black, Chicana, and White Feminist Movements in America's Second Wave, Cambridge University Press, 2004
 Stansell, Christine. The Feminist Promise: 1792 to the Present (2010). , 528 pp.

Sexuality
 Foucault, Michel. The History of Sexuality. Random House, New York, 1978
 Soble, Alan (ed.) The Philosophy of Sex: Contemporary readings. Lanham, MD: & Littlefield, 2002.

Further reading
Browne, Alice (1987) The Eighteenth-century Feminist Mind. Brighton: Harvester

External links

Independent Voices: an open access collection of alternative press newspapers
Timeline of feminist history in the USA
UN Department of Economic and Social Affairs, Division for the Advancement of Women
Women in Politics: A Very Short History at Click! The Ongoing Feminist Revolution
The Women's Library , online resource of the extensive collections at the LSE

Feminism
 
History of social movements
Women's suffrage